Jean Lafitte National Historical Park and Preserve protects the natural and cultural resources of Louisiana's Mississippi River Delta region. It is named after French pirate Jean Lafitte and consists of six separate sites and a park headquarters.

Acadiana
Three sites interpret the Cajun culture of the Lafayette (southern Louisiana) area, which developed after Acadians were resettled in the region following their expulsion from Canada (1755–1764) by the British, and the transfer of French Louisiana to Spain in the aftermath of the French and Indian War.

 Acadian Cultural Center in Lafayette
 Prairie Acadian Cultural Center in Eunice, obtained through the work of Mayor Curtis Joubert
 Wetlands Acadian Cultural Center in Thibodaux

Nature preserve

The Barataria Preserve in Marrero interprets the natural and cultural history of the region. The preserve has trails and canoe tours through bottomland hardwood forests, swamps, and marsh. An Education Center provides curriculum-based programming for school groups and a visitor center with a film and exhibits. The  Barataria area comprises 63 contributing properties and was added as a historic district on October 15, 1966.

Chalmette unit

It is "an integral part of both the history of New Orleans and of the nation," according to National Park Service historians because the cemetery is one of the oldest in the United States.

Established in May 1864, the national cemetery holds the remains of American Civil War casualties and veterans, as well as the remains of soldiers from the Indian Wars of the late 19th century, the Spanish–American War, the First and Second World Wars, the Korean War, and the Vietnam War. Among the Civil War dead interred at Chalmette are members of the 47th Pennsylvania Infantry Regiment, the only regiment from Pennsylvania involved in the 1864 Red River campaign, and the 12th Maine Infantry Regiment. There are also a few earlier graves from the 1815 Battle of New Orleans. 

During the 1930s, various improvements were made to the Jean Lafitte National Historical Park and Preserve, "including paving the entrance drive linking to St. Bernard Highway, paving the circle around the monument, and installation of two visitor parking areas." In addition, employees of the Works Progress Administration (WPA) realigned multiple headstones at the national cemetery in 1937.

During the early 1960s, the historic community of Fazendeville was demolished in order to expand the battlefield in preparation for the commemoration of the 150th anniversary of the Battle of New Orleans, which took place in 1965. The town, which had been established sometime around 1870 by Jean-Pierre Fazende, had been "founded as a home for newly freed slaves," according to news reports. Local, state and federal elected officials had been engaged in efforts to acquire the community's lands since at least the early 1930s.

 Another major restoration took place from March 7 to April 1, 2016 when volunteers from HOPE Crew (Hands-on Preservation Experience) participated, in partnership with the National Trust for Historic Preservation, the National Park Service and the National Center of Preservation Technology and Training, in the cleaning and re-setting of 671 headstones in the oldest part of the national cemetery, which is "the final resting place for US Colored Troops, servicemen who consisted of 'free men of color' formerly known as the Louisiana Native Guard; free, mixed-race 'creoles' who the Confederacy barred from joining their forces, and refugees, or 'contraband' from nearby plantations who served the Union Army in exchange for food, clothing and housing for their families," according to a spokesperson for the trust. The headstones that were restored had been misaligned or damaged by air pollution and mold growth, and were cleaned with products donated by D/2 Biological Solution, Inc. Restoration experts from Pierre Masonry, Texas Cemetery Restoration, Oak and Laurel Cemetery Preservation and Monument Conservation Collaborative were recruited to oversee the volunteers' work.

 Located adjacent to the Chalmette National Cemetery, and within the boundaries of the Jean Lafitte National Historical Park and Preserve, is the site of the defunct Freedmen's Cemetery, a four-acre  African American burial ground that had been established by the federal government in 1867 to inter the remains of formerly enslaved men, women and children who had been receiving assistance from the U.S. Bureau of Refugees, Freedmen, and Abandoned Lands (also known as the Freedmen's Bureau) in making the transition from slavery to freedom after the Civil War. Initially well maintained, the cemetery fell into disrepair during the 1870s as various Freedmen's Bureau services were curtailed and then eliminated due to budget cuts and "the politics of race and Reconstruction." U.S. Quartermaster's Office records document the debates by federal government officials regarding the creation and management of this cemetery, as well as their decision to ultimately abandon the Freedmen's Cemetery. The site is now memorialized by a historical marker located near the entrance to Chalmette National Cemetery.

Chalmette Monuments and Visitors' Center 
In 1840, a cornerstone was laid for a proposed monument commemorating the American victory in the Battle of New Orleans, but completion of that monument's construction was delayed due to budget issues. Frustrated by the federal government's lack of progress, members of the Louisiana Society of the United States Daughters of 1776 and 1812 began lobbying elected officials for help during the 1890s, finally securing the support necessary from the administration of President Theodore Roosevelt for the monument's erection. Known as the Chalmette Monument, the one-hundred-foot-tall obelisk was completed in 1908. Closed for repairs after parts of the Jean Lafitte National Historical Park and Preserve were damaged or destroyed by Hurricane Katrina in 2005, it was reopened to the public during a rededication ceremony on National Public Lands Day on September 28, 2013. The monument features an observation deck which offers visitors views of the battlefield and City of New Orleans.

 In February 1874, members of the Grand Army of the Republic's Joseph Mower Post in New Orleans secured permission to erect a G.A.R. monument on the grounds of the national cemetery to pay tribute to deceased Union Army soldiers. Although implementation of this project was also delayed due to funding problems, construction was able to be finished more quickly than it was for the proposed obelisk. Completed in 1882, the G.A.R. monument was inscribed with the Latin phrase, "Dum Tacent Clamant" ("While They Are Silent, They Cry Aloud"), and has served as "a focal point" for Memorial Day ceremonies since that time.

The present-day visitors' center located near the battleground obelisk offers information and exhibits. Rebuilt after it was destroyed in 2005 by Hurricane Katrina, this new center reopened in 2010.

Special events held at the Chalmette National Battlefield and Cemetery each year include commemoration ceremonies related to the Battle of New Orleans and Memorial Day, living history demonstrations, and wreath-laying ceremonies.

New Orleans unit
The park operates a French Quarter Visitor Center at 419 Decatur Street (New Orleans), in the historic French Quarter. It interprets more generally the history of New Orleans and the diverse cultures of Louisiana's Mississippi River Delta region.

The headquarters of Jean Lafitte National Historical Park and Preserve are located in New Orleans.

Administrative history
Chalmette Monument and Grounds were established on March 4, 1907, to commemorate the site of the Battle of New Orleans. It was transferred from the War Department to the National Park Service on August 10, 1933, and re-designated as Chalmette National Historical Park on August 10, 1939.

The Chalmette site and the Barataria Preserve were both listed on the National Register of Historic Places October 15, 1966.

The Chalmette site was later incorporated into the multi-site Jean Lafitte National Historical Park and Preserve, which was authorized on November 10, 1978.

See also

Freedmen's Cemetery 
Historic Cemeteries of New Orleans
National Register of Historic Places listings in Jefferson Parish, Louisiana
New Orleans Jazz National Historical Park

Gallery

References

External links

 National Park Service: Jean Lafitte National Historical Park and Preserve
 Acadian Cultural Center
 Barataria Preserve
 Chalmette Battlefield and National Cemetery
 Chalmette National Cemetery Virtual Tour
 French Quarter Visitor Center
 Prairie Acadian Cultural Center
 Wetlands Acadian Cultural Center

National Historical Parks of the United States
National Preserves of the United States
Cajun culture
French-American culture in Louisiana
Landmarks of the War of 1812
Parks on the National Register of Historic Places in Louisiana
Museums in Lafayette Parish, Louisiana
Museums in Jefferson Parish, Louisiana
Museums in Lafourche Parish, Louisiana
Museums in St. Bernard Parish, Louisiana
Museums in St. Landry Parish, Louisiana
History museums in Louisiana
Protected areas established in 1907
National Park Service areas in Louisiana
Protected areas of Jefferson Parish, Louisiana
Protected areas of St. Bernard Parish, Louisiana
Ethnic museums in Louisiana
Museums in New Orleans
Atchafalaya National Heritage Area
1907 establishments in Louisiana
Protected areas established in 1978
1978 establishments in Louisiana
National Register of Historic Places in St. Bernard Parish, Louisiana
National Register of Historic Places in Lafayette Parish, Louisiana
National Register of Historic Places in Jefferson Parish, Louisiana
National Register of Historic Places in Lafourche Parish, Louisiana
National Register of Historic Places in St. Landry Parish, Louisiana